Swedish Australians are Australians with Swedish ancestry, most often related to the large groups of immigrants from Sweden in the late nineteenth century and early twentieth century. The 2011 Census showed 34,029 people who claimed Swedish ancestry, having an increase compared to those 30,375 in 2006. Most Swedish Australians are Lutherans affiliated with the Evangelical Lutheran Church. They form the largest Scandinavian minority in Australia.

History
A Swede may have been the first European to land in some spots on the Australian coast. Swedish botanist Daniel Solander (the first university-educated person to step on the Australian ground) and Britain's Sir Joseph Banks documented the flora and fauna of Australia on Captain James Cook's 1770 expedition to Australia.

King Gustav III of Sweden authorised the founding of a Swedish settlement in Western Australia in November 1786, but the outbreak of war with Russia the following year prevented this from taking place.

The first organised immigration from Sweden took place during the years 1871-1900, when Queensland and Tasmania invited immigrants to take up farming leases. Numbers were small compared to the hundreds of thousands of Swedes who emigrated to the US. In more modern times, Australia's Swedish-descent population has been made up of farers. 

The Swedish immigrants that arrived in recent decades settled mostly in the suburbs of Sydney, Melbourne and Brisbane.

Swedish Australians usually came through Sydney and a few of them actually settled in Brisbane as well.  Most were Lutheran and belonged to synods now associated with the Evangelical Lutheran Church, including the Augustana Evangelical Lutheran Church, although  a few others in the Queensland converted to Catholicism. Theologically, they were pietistic; politically, they supported progressive causes, and prohibition.

A Swedish-Australian fraternal organisation was founded to help immigrants, who often lacked an adequate network of social services.

Many others settled in Perth in particular as well as Canberra, Newcastle and South Australia. In the west, Perth became a destination for many skilled industrial workers and Swedish centres developed in these areas.

Notable Swedish Australians

 Daniel Amalm
 Johan Anderson
 Elise Archer
 Mikael Borglund
 Anita Hegh (Estonian of Swedish-origin mother)
 Caroline Johansson
 Gordon Cheng (Chinese of Swedish-origin mother)
 David Leyonhjelm
 Jack Lindwall
 Ray Lindwall
 Claes Loberg
 Kris Massie (Australian rules footballer)
 Dave Nilsson
 Kjell Nilsson
 Hulda Olsson wife of Thomas Wardle, on a trip to Sweden Thomas got the idea to his Tom the Cheap-stores.
 George Petersen
 Kerryn Phelps
 Peter Phelps
 Hugo William Du Rietz, was a pioneer gold miner and architect in Gympie, Queensland, Australia. He was the architect of many heritage-listed buildings in Gympie
 Charles Rosenthal
 Daniel Solander

See also 
 Australia–Sweden relations
 European Australians
 Europeans in Oceania
 Immigration to Australia
 Scandinavia
 Swedes
 Swedish diaspora
 Swedish Americans

References

 
 
European Australian